Jimmy Birklin (born 12 January 1970) is a Swedish orienteering competitor, winner of the 2001 Sprint World Orienteering Championships.

He was also part of the Swedish team that obtained bronze medal both in the 1995 and 1999 Relay World Championships.

References

External links
 
 

1970 births
Living people
Swedish orienteers
Male orienteers
Foot orienteers
World Orienteering Championships medalists
Junior World Orienteering Championships medalists